The following lists events that happened during 1843 in New Zealand.

Population
The estimated population of New Zealand at the end of 1843 is 75,400 Māori and 11,848 non-Māori.

Incumbents

Regal and viceregal
Head of State – Queen Victoria
Governor – Captain Robert Fitzroy arrives to take up the position on 26 December replacing Captain William Hobson who died the previous year.

Government and law
Chief Justice – William Martin

Main centre leaders
Mayor of Wellington – George Hunter dies on 19 July. The runner-up in the election the previous year, William Guyton, is declared Mayor. News that the Borough of Wellington has been declared illegal by the British Government reaches Wellington in late September. The Borough is abolished as is the office of Mayor. (see also 1842, 1863 & 1870)

Events 
22 April: The Southern Cross publishes its first issue. The Auckland-based newspaper publishes weekly, with a hiatus in 1845–1847, and from 1862 daily when it will also change its name to The Daily Southern Cross. It will eventually merge with The New Zealand Herald in 1876.
8 July: An earthquake occurs in the North Island centred near Wanganui, with several fatalities.
2 August: The New Zealand Colonist and Port Nicholson Advertiser ceases publishing after one year.
4 November: The Bay of Islands Advocate begins publishing. It runs for three months.

Births
 10 January Gilbert Mair, soldier

Unknown date
 (in Scotland): John Blair, Mayor of Wellington.
 (in Ireland): George Fisher, politician.
 (in England): Charles Hall, politician.

Deaths
 17 June (Wairau Affray):
William Patchett, early settler
Arthur Wakefield, founder of Nelson
 19 July: George Hunter, first Mayor of Wellington (b. 1788)

See also
History of New Zealand
List of years in New Zealand
Military history of New Zealand
Timeline of New Zealand history
Timeline of New Zealand's links with Antarctica
Timeline of the New Zealand environment

References